The President's Rana Parashuwa and the Regimental Rana Parashuwa are ceremonial hatchets carried by the Special Forces Regiment that serves as the equivalent of and is carried as the colours.

See also 
 President's Truncheon

References

Special Forces Regiment
Ceremonial weapons